"Sugar Rush Ride" is a song recorded by South Korean boy band Tomorrow X Together as the lead single from their fifth Korean extended play (EP) The Name Chapter: Temptation. It was released on January 27, 2023, through Big Hit Music and Republic Records.

Background and release
Hybe Corporation, parent company of Big Hit Music, first revealed plans for Tomorrow X Together to release an EP in January 2023 at a corporate briefing on November 9, 2022. The group's new album series, The Name Chapter, was teased first during their performance at the 2022 Melon Music Awards on November 26 and again in a concept trailer uploaded to their official YouTube channel on December 3. The EP was formally announced on social media platforms on December 14 and released on January 27, 2023.

Composition
"Sugar Rush Ride", follows a "saccharine dance pop" song with "funky guitar riffs" and whistles. The song was composed in the key of A♯ minor, 125 beats per minute with a running time of three minutes and six seconds.

Accolades

Charts

Weekly charts

Monthly charts

References 

2023 singles
2023 songs
Hybe Corporation singles
Korean-language songs
Republic Records singles
Songs written by Bang Si-hyuk